RAFGL, the "Revised Air Force Geophysical Laboratory" (S.D. Price and T.L. Murdock, 1983), is a four-color infrared sky survey catalog. It contains measurements at 4.2, 11.0, 19.8 and 27.4 micron of 2,970 sources, obtained with sounding rockets, in combination with some ground-based data.

The catalog includes most of the AFCRL (Air Force Cambridge Research Lab) with the same number, omitting unconfirmed sources, and also, 306 new sources of the southern hemisphere, numbered from 
4001 to 4306. It also gives updated positions and more accurate results.

References

Astronomical databases
Astronomical catalogues